Ophichthus maculatus is an eel in the family Ophichthidae (worm/snake eels). It was described by Rafinesque in 1810.

References

maculatus
Taxa named by Constantine Samuel Rafinesque
Fish described in 1810